Biologic may refer to: 
 biology – a process or phenomenon connected with life or living organisms
 biologic medical product – a medicinal preparation created by a biological process